The Community Radiative Transfer Model  (CRTM) is a fast radiative transfer model for calculations of radiances for satellite infrared or microwave radiometers.

Given an atmospheric profile of temperature, variable gas concentrations, cloud and surface properties CRTM calculates radiances and brightness temperatures. The only mandatory inputs in terms of variable gases are water vapor and ozone. The range of temperatures and water vapour concentrations over which the optical depth computations are valid depends on the training datasets which were used.

CRTM contains forward, tangent linear, adjoint and K (full Jacobian matrices) versions of the model; the latter three modules are used in inversion methods, including variational assimilation and satellite retrievals.

The CRTM model is used primarily in numerical weather prediction codes employed by NOAA and NASA.     Its primary function is to relate changes in satellite-based observations to changes in the model physical state.  This capability is essential to the use of satellite observations in data assimilation methodologies.   One of several applications of CRTM are retrievals of brightness temperature and sea surface temperature from Advanced Very High Resolution Radiometer sensor, among many other infrared and microwave sensors.

See also 
 List of atmospheric radiative transfer codes
 RTTOV (radiative transfer code)

References 
Chen Y, F. Weng, Y. Han, and Q. Liu, 2008: Validation of the community radiative transfer model (CRTM) by using CloudSat Data. J. Geophys.Res., 113(D8), 2156–2202.

Ding, Shouguo, Ping Yang, Fuzhong Weng, Quanhua Liu, Yong Han, Paul Van Delst, Jun Li, and Bryan Baum, 2011: Validation of the community radiative transfer model.  Journal of Quantitative Spectroscopy and Radiative Transfer 112 (6): 1050–1064.

Wei, S. W., Lu, C. H., Johnson, B. T., Dang, C., Stegmann, P., Grogan, D., ... & Hu, M. (2022). The influence of aerosols on satellite infrared radiance simulations and Jacobians: Numerical experiments of CRTM and GSI. Remote Sensing, 14(3), 683.

External links 
 JCSDA Projects - Community Radiative Transfer Model
 MICROS, Monitoring of IR Clear-sky Radiances over Oceans for SST

Atmospheric radiative transfer codes
Satellite meteorology